is a village located in Fukushima Prefecture, Japan. ,  the village had an estimated population of 2,697 in 1091 households, and a population density of 12 persons per km².

Geography
Kitashiobara is located at the far northern Aizu region of Fukushima Prefecture, bordered by Yamagata Prefecture to the north. Kitashiobara consists of three areas, named after the former the villages of Kitayama, Ōshio, and Hibara. The western portion, Hibara, has a higher elevation than the other two areas, most of it between 800 m and 1000 m. Also, Lake Hibara in Hibara is located in the Bandai-Asahi National Park. It was created in 1888 during the eruption of Mount Bandai. Oguni-numa, a swamp, is reserved by the Japanese government as a natural monument. Some 86% of the village area is covered in mountains and forest.

Mountains : Mount Bandai
Rivers : Nakutsu-gawa, Ono-gawa
Lakes : Lake Hibara, Goshiki-numa, Lake Onogawa, Oguni-numa, Akimoto Lake

Neighboring municipalities
Fukushima Prefecture
Kitakata
Inawashiro
Bandai
Yamagata Prefecture
Yonezawa

Climate
Kitashiobara has a Humid continental climate (Köppen Dfb) characterized by warm summers and cold winters with heavy snowfall.  The average annual temperature in Kitashiobara is 7.4 °C. The average annual rainfall is 1666 mm with September as the wettest month. The temperatures are highest on average in August, at around 20.8 °C, and lowest in January, at around -4.9 °C.

Demographics
Per Japanese census data, the population of Kitashiobara has declined steadily over the past 40 years.

History
The area of present-day Kitashiobara was part of ancient Mutsu Province, and formed part of the holdings of Aizu Domain during the Edo period. After the Meiji Restoration, it was organized as part of Yama District, Fukushima Prefecture. The villages of Kitayama, Ōshio and Hibara. were created with the establishment of the modern municipalities system on April 1, 1884. The three villages merged to form the village of Kitashiobara village was created on March 31, 1954.

Economy
The economy of Kitashiobara is dependent on agriculture, seasonal tourism, and the mining of salt.

Education
Kitashiobara has two public elementary schools and two public junior high schools operated by the village government. The village does not have a public high school.

Transportation

Railway
Kitashiobara does not have any passenger rail service.

Highway

Local attractions
Morohashi Museum of Modern Art
Bandai-Asahi National Park
Goshiki-numa

Notes

External links

Official Website 

 
Villages in Fukushima Prefecture